Compton White may refer to:

 Compton I. White (1877–1956), US Representative from Idaho
 Compton I. White Jr. (1920–1998), US Representative from Idaho